UnionsWA is the peak Trades and Labour Council in Western Australia. It represents over 30 affiliated unions, which have over 150,000 members in Western Australia. The Council is affiliated with the Australian Council of Trade Unions (ACTU).

Name changes
In April 2000, the Trades & Labor Council of Western Australia became simply UnionsWA, to coincide with the consolidation of various union based operations within Western Australia and the opening of "Unity House" on May Day, 2000.

1891 - The Trades & Labor Council, Perth was formed in 1891 and operated as such until 1907 when it re-emerged as the Western Australian Branch of the Australian Labour Federation.

1927 - Twenty years later, in 1927, it was operating as the Australian Labor Party (WA).

1947 - It continued in this guise for another twenty years when, in 1947, the name was changed once more, this time to the Trade Unions Industrial Council (ALP, WA) to more accurately delineate its trade union role from the political motives of the labour movement.

1963 - The Trade Unions Industrial Council (ALP, WA) was deregistered and the Trades & Labor Council of Western Australia was formed to fill the void.

Although still acknowledged today as the Trades & Labor Council of Western Australia, an increasing association with "white collar" unions had, by 2000, deemed this old title unreflective of all affiliated unions.

2000 - The Trades & Labor Council became UnionsWA to more adequately encompass both white and blue collar unions.

2013 - The Council's trading name becomes UnionsWA Inc.

Structure

UnionsWA is the state's peak union body representing over 30 affiliated unions and their members. Delegates meet monthly to consider issues affecting the working conditions of Western Australians and determine strategies to improve them. The offices of UnionsWA are located at 445 Hay Street, Perth. UnionsWA is the supreme governing body of the trade union movement in Western Australia.

The present office holders are:
 Acting secretary: Owen Whittle
 President: Steve McCartney (Australian Manufacturing Workers' Union)
 Senior vice-president: Carolyn Smith (United Voice)

Solidarity Park

UnionsWA is responsible for the use, upkeep, and maintenance of Solidarity Park, opposite the Parliament House in Perth, Western Australia.

Originally named the Workers' Embassy, the park was established in 1997 as part of the 6-month occupation of the site in protest against the Court Liberal Government's industrial relations legislation.

The Mark Allen Memorial Wall at the park commemorates all killed and injured workers, with the International Workers' Memorial Day WA service held annually in April.

See also

 Australian labour movement
 Trades Hall
 Perth Trades Hall
 Trade union
 Victorian Trades Hall Council

References

External links
 Official website
 Australian Trade Union Archives
 Alex McCallum biography

Further reading
 Layman, Lenore.(and Julian Goddard; with the assistance of Wendy Wise and Robin Ho) (1988) Organise! : a visual record of the labour movement in Western Australia East Perth, W.A : Trades and Labor Council of W.A 
 Oliver, Bobbie, (2003) Unity is strength : a history of the Australian Labor Party and the Trades and Labor Council in Western Australia, 1899-1999 Perth WA : API Network, Australia Research Institute, Curtin University. 

Trade unions in Western Australia